The 1990 Scheldeprijs was the 77th edition of the Scheldeprijs cycle race and was held on 17 April 1990. The race was won by John Talen of the Panasonic team.

General classification

References

1990
1990 in road cycling
1990 in Belgian sport